DBTT can stand for:
Ductile-Brittle Transition Temperature, a concept in Materials Science
Don't Believe the Truth, the sixth album by British rock band Oasis